Almagro may refer to:

People
Diego de Almagro (1475–1538), Spanish explorer
Diego Almagro II (1520–1542), assassin of Spanish conquistador Francisco Pizarro
Luis Almagro (born 1963), Uruguayan lawyer, diplomat and politician
Nicolás Almagro (born 1985), Spanish tennis player

Places
Almagro, Buenos Aires, Argentina
Almagro, Samar, municipality of the Samar province, Philippines
Almagro, Ciudad Real, Castile-La Mancha, Spain
Almagro (Madrid), Spain

Other
Club Almagro, an Argentine football club from Almagro, Buenos Aires
Estadio Almagro, a multi-use stadium in Buenos Aires, Argentina
Diego de Almagro Island

See also
San Lorenzo de Almagro, an Argentine football club from Buenos Aires